Rhythm & Blues is the thirteenth studio album by the British musician Robert Palmer. It was first released in Japan in October 1998, before being released elsewhere in 1999, and was his first new release in five years. The album reached No. 118 in the UK but did not chart in the US. Palmer's long-term girlfriend Mary Ambrose sang background vocals on some tracks, as did Sharon O'Neill who co-wrote "True Love".

The album's only single "True Love" peaked at #94 in the UK.

Track listing
All tracks written by Robert Palmer except where noted.

US track listing
 "True Love" (Robert Palmer, Sharon O'Neill, Alan Mansfield) – 4:19
 "No Problem" – 3:35
 "Let's Get It On" [99] (Marvin Gaye, Ed Townsend) – 4:09
 "Stone Cold" – 4:28
 "Sex Appeal" – 4:34
 "Work to Make It Work" [99] – 3:34
 "All the Will in the World" – 4:57
 "You're Not the Only One" – 3:39
 "Mr. Wise Guy" – 3:32
 "I Choose You" (Robert Palmer, Willie Hutch) – 4:18
 "Dance for Me" – 3:53
 "Twenty Million Things" (Jed Levy, Lowell George) – 3:09

The UK & Canadian track listing features all the same songs with the exception that the track "Dance for Me" is replaced by the track "Tennis", written by Palmer. The tracks also appear in different order.

Personnel
Robert Palmer - vocals, arrangements 
Featuring – Alan Mansfield (track 1), Bertram Engel (tracks 3, 7, 8), Bill Payne (track 12), Carl Carlton (2) (tracks 3, 7, 8, 11), Ken Taylor (tracks 3, 7, 8), Pascal Kravetz (tracks 3, 7, 8).
James Palmer (track 12) and Mauro Spina (track 12) - percussion
Mary Ambrose - strings (track 12)
Mary Ambrose (track 12) and Sharon O'Neill (track 12) - backing vocals
Technical
Producers – Pino Pischetola and Robert Palmer
Production Assistant – Paul Cavanaugh
Production Coordinator – Richard Coble
Engineered and Mixed by Pino Pischetola (tracks 1-10 & 12) and Alessandro Benedetto (track 11).
Assistant Engineer – Nick Friend
Editing – Kurt Wipfli
Mastered by Antonio Baglio
Design Concept and Logo – Robert Palmer
Art Direction – Ian Ross
Photography – Fabio Nosotti (cover) and Mark Allan (inner).

References

1998 albums
Robert Palmer (singer) albums
EMI America Records albums
Eagle Records albums
Albums produced by Robert Palmer (singer)